Lysimachia is a lake in Aetolia-Acarnania, western Greece. Its area is 13.2 km², its depth is around 9 m. It is fed by the small river Ermitsa, and by a canal that connects the lake with the larger Lake Trichonida to its east. Its outflow is the river Dimikos, which drains into the river Acheloos. The city of Agrinio lies 6 km to the northeast.

References
The first version of the article is translated from the article at the Greek Wikipedia (Main page)

Landforms of Aetolia-Acarnania
Lysimachia
Agrinio
Landforms of Western Greece